Your Moment was a Philippine reality talent competition show and broadcast by ABS-CBN from November 9, 2019, to February 2, 2020, replacing The Voice Kids. It was replaced by The Voice Teens.

Format 
Billed as the 2-in-1 reality talent competition show, it is known for state-of-the-art innovations such as the revolving immersive set, where the audience and the judges witness their performances from the singing to the dancing stage, and vice versa. The judges also evaluate acts' performances using an emotion meter knob which reflect their scores in real time.

Each performance starts in black-and-white and bursts with lights and color as it progresses, while the judges have to input their scores three times using an emotion meter knob, ranging them from 0% as the lowest to 100% the highest. An emotion meter also appears on-screen reflecting the scores given by the judges every time a performance reaches the three time markers (20, 60, and 90 seconds), which indicate the time they can score.

Levels
The acts must accomplish four competitive "levels" in order to become one of the grand champions:

Production
ABS-CBN first announced the development of the program in October 2019. It is produced by ABS-CBN Entertainment, in a collaboration with Dutch production companies Fritz Productions and Three Thoughts Ahead. Episode tapings took place at ABS-CBN Soundstage based at Horizon IT Park in San Jose del Monte, Bulacan.

A digital watch-along based "companion show" known as Your Moment Apartment airs together with its main program through Facebook and YouTube. It is co-hosted by Dawn Chang, Sharlene San Pedro, and AC Bonifacio.

Episodes

Level 1: Your First Moment

Bonus Level: Your Wildcard Moment

Level 2: Your Moment of Choice

Level 3: Your Moment of Power

Level 4: Your Grand Moment

Reception

Television ratings

Source: Kantar Media Philippines

See also
 List of programs broadcast by ABS-CBN

References

ABS-CBN original programming
2019 Philippine television series debuts
2020 Philippine television series endings
2020s Philippine television series
Filipino-language television shows
Talent shows